HMS Sandwich was a 90-gun second rate ship of the line of the Royal Navy, launched in May 1679 at Harwich.

At the battle of Barfleur, she failed to anchor during the flood tide at evening and as a result was swept through the French fleet taking several raking shots with the captain Antony Hastings being killed.

She underwent a rebuild at Chatham Dockyard, from where she was relaunched on 21 April 1712 as a 90-gun second rate built to the 1706 Establishment. Sandwich was broken up in 1770.

From March 1720 - November 1721, William Smellie, who became a man-midwife and the 'master of British midwifery', 'it seems certain' was naval surgeon on HMS Sandwich.

Notes

References

Lavery, Brian (2003) The Ship of the Line - Volume 1: The development of the battlefleet 1650-1850. Conway Maritime Press. .

Ships of the line of the Royal Navy
1670s ships
Ships built in Harwich